No. 691 Squadron RAF was an Anti-aircraft cooperation squadron of the Royal Air Force from 1943 to 1949.

History
The squadron was formed on 1 December 1943 at RNAS Roborough from 1623 (anti-aircraft co-operation) Flight. It was tasked with anti-aircraft co-operation duties in the Plymouth area operating a variety of aircraft in this role. Most of the work was to fly as training targets for Royal Navy ships.
The squadron moved a number of times from the end of the war to RAF Exeter, RAF Weston Zoyland, RAF Fairwood Common, and finally to RAF Chivenor. Its existence ended there when it was renumbered to No. 17 Squadron RAF on 11 February 1949.

Aircraft operated

Squadron bases

See also
List of Royal Air Force aircraft squadrons

References

Citations

Bibliography

External links

 Nos. 671–1435 Squadron Histories on rafweb
 Aircraft and markings of No. 691 Squadron
 History of No. 691 Squadron

No. 691
Royal Air Force aircraft squadrons
Military units and formations established in 1943
Military units and formations disestablished in 1949